Simon Hanselmann  is an Australian-born cartoonist best known for his Megg, Mogg, and Owl series. Hanselmann has been nominated four times for an Ignatz Award, four times for an Eisner Award, once for the Harvey Award and won Best Series at Angouleme 2018.

Art career
Hanselmann's Megg, Mogg, and Owl comics are currently published in 13 languages internationally.

Although the title characters are a witch and a cat, like the popular 1970s children's book heroes Meg and Mog, "they are emphatically not the same". In Hanselmann's stories, the pair are "depressed drug users struggling with life", and are usually accompanied by two other regular characters, the uptight Owl and the highly volatile Werewolf Jones.

Hanselmann's primary English-language publisher is Fantagraphics Books. He is currently living in California with his wife and daughter.

In March 2020, he began serializing a pandemic-themed serial, Crisis Zone, on his Instagram. 

In October 2022, Megg, Mogg & Owl made their animated debut in the anthology film The Paloni Show! Halloween Special! for Hulu produced by Justin Roiland. The short is titled Megahex, Devil’s Night, and featured the voices of Emma Chamberlain as Megg, Macaulay Culkin as Mogg, Dave Foley as Owl, and Jon Glaser as Werewolf Jones.

Awards

Nominations
2013 Ignatz Award for Outstanding Comic for St. Owl's Bay
2014 Ignatz Award for Outstanding Story for "Jobs" from Life Zone
2016 in selection at Angoulême festival BD for "Magical Ecstacy Trip"
2016 Ignatz Award for Best Series and Best Story for Amsterdam
2017 in selection at Angoulême festival BD for "Megg & Mogg in Amsterdam"
2017 Eisner Award for Best Short Story for "The Comics Wedding of the Century"
2017 Eisner Award for Best Graphic Album Reprint for "Megg & Mogg in Amsterdam"
2018 Angoulême International Comics Festival Award for "Best Series"

Bibliography

Minicomics, webcomics, and anthology contributions
St. Owl's Bay (2013), broadsheet newspaper, published by Floating World Comics
Mould Map 3 (2014), two-page strip, published by Landfill Editions
Megg, Mogg, & Owl (2014–ongoing), weekly comic, published online by Vice
Werewolf Jones and Sons issue 1 (2015), with HTMLflowers; self-published
Dome (2016), three-page strip, published by Lagon Revue and Breakdown Press
Winter Trauma (2016), self-published minicomic
Drone (2016), edition of 400, self-published minicomic
Minihex (2016), published by Fantagraphics
Landscape (2016), self-published minicomic
Gouffre (2017), 10 page strip, published by Lagon Revue
Portrait (2017), edition of 400, self-published minicomic
Hard Rubbish (2017), 12 pages, edition of 300, self-published minicomic
Innessential Garbage (2017), published by Fantagraphics
WOTW (2017), 16 pages, edition of 500, self-published minicomic
XMP-165 (2017), 28 pages, edition of 500, self-published magazine
Performance (2017),16 pages, 3000 copies, broadsheet newspaper, published by Floating World 
Lucidity (2017), 44 pages, edition of 550, self-published minicomic
Werewolf Jones and Sons 2 (2017), with HTMLflowers; 24 pages, edition of 500, self-published
Romance (2017), 12 pages, edition of 600, self-published minicomic
Apartments 24 pages, edition of 600, self-published minicomic
 Entertainment 24 pages, edition of 600, self-published minicomic
Megg, Mogg, & Penguins 16 pages, edition of 700, self-published minicomic 
Decade 60 pages, edition of 750, signed and numbered self-published minicomic 
Knife Crime (July 2019), 36 pages, self-published minicomic
Werewolf Jones and Sons #3 (2019), with HTMLflowers, 28 pages, edition of 500, self-published minicomic
Megahex 2020 Winter Trauma Annual (December 2019), 52 pages, edition of 700, self-published minicomic 
Below Ambition (2020), 36 pages, edition of 600, self-published minicomic

Books
Life Zone (2013), Space Face Books,  (all stories in Life Zone are republished in One More Year)
Megahex (2014), Fantagraphics Books, 
Worst Behavior (2015), Pigeon Press,  (this is a black-and-white book; the same story appeared in One More Year)
Megg & Mogg in Amsterdam (And Other Stories) (2016), Fantagraphics Books, 
One More Year (2017), Fantagraphics Books, 
Bad Gateway (2019),  Fantagraphics Books, 
Seeds and Stems (2020),  Fantagraphics Books, 
Crisis Zone (2021),  Fantagraphics Books, 
Below Ambition (2022), Fantagraphics Books,

References

Australian cartoonists
People from Launceston, Tasmania
Year of birth missing (living people)
Living people
Genderfluid people